is a 2014 science fiction anime series based on the manga by Lynn Okamoto. The series aired on April 6 on Tokyo MX and later on ytv, CTV, BS11 and AT-X then finished on June 29, 2014. For episodes 1-9 the opening is "BRYNHILDR IN THE DARKNESS -Ver. EJECTED-" by Nao Tokisawa. From episode 10 onwards, the opening is "Virture and Vice" by Fear, and Loathing in Las Vegas. The ending song is "Ichiban Hoshi" by Risa Taneda, Aya Suzaki, MAO, & Azusa Tadokoro. The anime is directed by Kenichi Imazumi at studio Arms, with Yukinori Kitajima acting as head writer and Hiroaki Kurasu as chief animation director and character designer.

When he was a child, Ryōta Murakami was infatuated with a girl called Kuroneko. She insisted on knowing about aliens and having met them, but no one believed her - even young Murakami was skeptical. One day, she decides to show him the aliens, but an accident occurs and Kuroneko dies while Murakami is left seriously wounded in the hospital. Years go by and Murakami obsesses on finding proof of the existence of aliens because of a promise he had made with Kuroneko. Then, one day, a new transfer student comes to his class, who not only looks a lot like Kuroneko, but is named Neko Kuroha. Despite Murakami's determination, she insists on never having met Murakami before. Furthermore, to his astonishment, the girl has superhuman strength and appears to be able to predict the future.



Episode list

Brynhildr in the Darkness

OVA

External links
Anime official website 

Brynhildr in the Darkness